Josiah Meigs (August 21, 1757 – September 4, 1822) was an American academic, journalist and government official. He was the first acting president of the University of Georgia (UGA) in Athens, where he implemented the university's first physics curriculum in 1801, and also president of the Columbian Institute for the Promotion of Arts and Sciences.

History

Meigs was the 13th and last child of Jonathan Meigs and Elizabeth Hamlin Meigs. His older brother was Return J. Meigs, Sr., whose son (Josiah's nephew) was Return J. Meigs, Jr., who served as a United States Senator and Governor of Ohio.

After graduating from Yale University in 1778 with a Bachelor of Arts (B.A) degree, Meigs studied law and was (from 1781 to 1784) a Yale tutor in mathematics, natural philosophy and astronomy. He was admitted to the bar in New Haven, Connecticut, in 1783, and served as New Haven city clerk from 1784 to 1789. During this period he and Eleutheros Dana established and published The New Haven Gazette (later known as The New Haven Gazette and the Connecticut Magazine). In 1788 Meigs published the first American Medical Journal.

Career

In 1789 Meigs left New Haven for St. George, Bermuda, where he practiced law and was involved in defending the owners of U.S. vessels that had been captured by British privateers. In 1794 he returned to the United States and took the chair of mathematics and natural philosophy at Yale. As a Republican, he was in conflict with the Federalists who ran Yale. He taught there until 1801 when he was chosen as the first acting president of the University of Georgia (UGA) in Athens.  His salary at Georgia was fixed at fifteen hundred dollars, and he was given four hundred dollars in moving expenses for his family.

At Georgia, Meigs implemented the university's first physics curriculum in 1801. He resigned as president on August 9, 1810, after clashing with the Board of Trustees for the University; however, he continued on in the position of Professor of Mathematics, Natural Philosophy and Chemistry for one more year. John Brown was elected by the Board of Trustees as the new president.

After his academic career at UGA, Meigs was appointed Surveyor General by President James Madison in 1812, residing in Cincinnati, Ohio. He then accepted an appointment as Commissioner of the United States General Land Office in Washington, D.C., in 1814. During his tenure at the U.S. Land Office, under Jefferson, he instituted the nation's first system of daily meteorological observations at the land offices throughout the country which evolved into the National Weather Service .

Societies

In 1818, Meigs was elected a member of the American Philosophical Society in Philadelphia. During the 1820s, Meigs was a member, and at one point, president, of the Columbian Institute for the Promotion of Arts and Sciences. He was also one of the original corporators and trustees of Columbian College (now George Washington University), and professor of experimental philosophy there.

Personal

In 1782, Meigs married Clara Benjamin. Their son Henry Meigs served in the U.S. Congress. Another son, Charles Delucena Meigs, became a prominent obstetrician. Their daughter Clara married John Forsyth, U.S. Secretary of State under Andrew Jackson and Martin Van Buren. Among his grandchildren was the American Civil War Major General Montgomery C. Meigs.

Meigs died on September 4, 1822, and was buried in Holmead's Cemetery in Washington, D.C. In 1878, when The cemetery was disbanded and the graves removed, he was reinterred in Arlington National Cemetery in the lot of Major General Meigs.

Legacy
He is remembered at the University of Georgia in the name of the university's highest teaching honor. The university annually recognizes up to five faculty members with the Josiah Meigs Distinguished Teaching Professorship.  The city of Meigs, Georgia, is named in his honor as is Meigs Street in Athens, Georgia.

Notes

Sources
History of the University of Georgia, Thomas Walter Reed,  Imprint:  Athens, Georgia : University of Georgia, ca. 1949
Arlington National Cemetery headstone and short bio for Josiah Meigs
New Georgia Encyclopedia entry for Josiah Meigs
History of Meigs Hall on the UGA campus

External links
 William M. Meigs, Life of Josiah Meigs, Philadelphia (J.P. Murphy, printer), 1887. 132 pages.

1757 births
1822 deaths
Presidents of the University of Georgia
Burials at Arlington National Cemetery
Writers from Athens, Georgia
American surveyors
General Land Office Commissioners
Burials at Holmead's Burying Ground
Surveyors General of the Northwest Territory
George Washington University trustees